Gerardo González (January 6, 1926 – February 13, 2003), better known in the boxing world as Kid Gavilan, was a Cuban boxer. Gavilán was the former undisputed welterweight champion from 1951 to 1954 having simultaneously held the NYSAC, WBA, and The Ring welterweight titles. The Boxing Writers Association of America named him Fighter of the Year in 1953. Gavilán was voted by The Ring magazine as the 26th greatest fighter of the last 80 years. Gavilán was a 1966 inductee to The Ring magazine's Boxing Hall of Fame (disbanded in 1987), and was inducted into the International Boxing Hall of Fame in the inaugural class of 1990.

Early career
Gavilan was managed by Yamil Chade, a boxing manager (based in Puerto Rico) who directed the careers of Wilfredo Gómez, Wilfred Benítez, Carlos De León and Félix Trinidad . He started as a professional boxer on the evening of June 5, 1943, when he beat Antonio Diaz by a decision in four rounds in Havana. His first 10 bouts were in Havana, and then he had one in Cienfuegos, but soon he returned to Havana for three more wins. After 14 bouts, he left Cuba for his first fight abroad, and he beat Julio César Jimenez by a decision in 10 rounds in his first of three consecutive fights in Mexico City. It was there that he suffered his first defeat, at the hands of Carlos Macalara by a decision. They had an immediate rematch, this time in Havana, and Gavilan avenged that loss, winning by decision too. Gavilan had a record of 25 wins, 2 losses and 1 draw already when he had his first fight on American soil. This happened on November 1, 1946, when he beat Johnny Ryan by a knockout in five rounds at New York City.

Move to the United States
He would split his time between the Eastern coast of the United States and Havana in 1947, a year in which he went 11-1-1 with 3 knockouts. However, by 1948 he had decided to stay in the United States indefinitely. That year, he met some very important fighters, like former world champion Ike Williams, who beat him by decision in ten, Tommy Bell, against whom Gavilan won by decision, Sugar Ray Robinson, who beat him by decision in ten, and Tony Pellone, with Gavilan obtaining a decision against Pellone.

After beating Williams twice by decision, he met Robinson with Robinson's world Welterweight title on the line. He lost his first title try, when Robinson won a decision in 15 rounds. Back to the drawing board, he beat Rocky Castellani, the then lightweight world champion Beau Jack, and Laurent Dauthuille (the latter of whom fought Gavilan in Montreal, Quebec). All of them were beaten by decision in 10. In 1950, he went 10-4-1, beating Billy Graham, Sonny Horne, Robert Villemain, Eugene Hairston, and Tony Janiro among others.

World champion
In 1951 after beating Tommy Ciarlo twice, once in Caracas, Venezuela, and Hairston once again, he finally became a world champion when he beat Johnny Bratton for the world Welterweight title by a decision in 15 on May 18. He defended that title for the first time against Graham, winning by a decision, and promptly made four non-title bouts before the end of the year, including another win over Janiro and a draw in ten with Bratton.

In 1952 he defended the title with success against Bobby Dykes, Gil Turner, and with Graham in a third encounter between the two. All those fights were won by decision in 15. He also had five non-title bouts, including three that were a part of an Argentinian tour. His third fight with Graham was his first world title defense in Havana and his fight with Dykes marked the first time that a black man and a white man had a boxing fight in then-segregated Miami, Florida. In 1953, Gavilan retained the title by a knockout in ten against Chuck Davey, by a decision in 15 against Carmen Basilio and by a decision in 15 against Bratton. He had seven non-title bouts, losing to Danny Womber, but beating Ralph Tiger Jones. In 1954 Gavilan went up in weight. After two more points wins, he challenged world Middleweight champion Bobo Olson for the world title, but lost a decision in 15. Then, he went down in weight, and lost his world Welterweight championship, by a decision in 15 to Johnny Saxton. That same year, he appeared on a Telemundo Puerto Rico poster that promoted that country's first television transmission.

Personal life
Gavilan's wife, Leonor, gave birth to their daughter, Victoria, in 1954. After retiring from boxing Gavilán became a Jehovah's Witness and was jailed under the Castro regime for preaching. In the 1980s he made a living selling sausages in Chicago.

Later career and retirement
From that point until 1958, when he retired, he had a career of ups and downs. He lost to Dykes, Jones, Eduardo Lausse, former world champion Tony DeMarco, Vince Martinez and Gaspar Ortega, but he also beat Ortega, Jones and Chico Vejar, among others. After losing to Yama Bahama by decision in ten on June 18, 1958, he never fought again, announcing his retirement on September 11 of that year. Gavilan was never knocked out in his professional career.  He had a record of 107 wins, 30 losses and 6 draws, with one no contest and 27 wins by knockout in a career that spanned 143 professional fights.

Death
Gavilan died in Miami, Florida of a heart attack at age 77.

Professional boxing record

See also
List of welterweight boxing champions

References

External links

Kid Gavilan biodata, IBHOF.com; accessed January 19, 2014.
 https://boxrec.com/media/index.php/National_Boxing_Association%27s_Quarterly_Ratings:_1949
 https://boxrec.com/media/index.php/National_Boxing_Association%27s_Quarterly_Ratings:_1951
 https://boxrec.com/media/index.php/National_Boxing_Association%27s_Quarterly_Ratings:_1952
 https://boxrec.com/media/index.php/National_Boxing_Association%27s_Quarterly_Ratings:_1953
 https://boxrec.com/media/index.php/National_Boxing_Association%27s_Quarterly_Ratings:_1954

|-

1926 births
2003 deaths
World boxing champions
Welterweight boxers
International Boxing Hall of Fame inductees
Cuban expatriates in the United States
Cuban male boxers
Cuban Jehovah's Witnesses
Converts to Jehovah's Witnesses